Meenar-2 dam is a concrete gravity type of dam constructed across the Meenar river which is a tributory of Pamba river in seethathodu village of Pathanamthitta district in Kerala,  India. This dam is constructed as a part of Sabaigiri Augmentation Scheme.

Sabarigiri Hydro Electric Project ( 340 MW) is the second largest hydro electric project of Kerala and is located in Pathanamthitta district.  The reservoir receives water from Meenar-I reservoir and its own catchment. Water from this reservoir is diverted to Pamba dam through an open channel. Taluks through which release flow are Ranni, Konni, Kozhencherry, Thiruvalla, Chengannur, Kuttanadu, Mavelikara and Karthikappally.

Specifications
Latitude : 9⁰ 24′ 36 ” N
Longitude: 77⁰ 10′ 43” E
Panchayath : Seethathodu
Classification : MH (Medium Height)
Village : Seethathodu
District : Pathanamthitta
River Basin : Pamba
River : Meenar
Release from Dam to river : Pamba
Year of completion: 1991
Name of Project : Sabarigiri HEP
Purpose of Project : Hydro Power
Dam type : Concrete Gravity
Maximum Water Level (MWL) : EL 1043.5 m
Full Reservoir Level ( FRL) : EL 1041.5 m
Storage at FRL : 0.06 Mm3
Height from deepest foundation : 17.07 m
Length : 82.00 m
Spillway : Ungated – overflow section
Crest Level : EL  1041.5 m
River Outlet : 1 No., Circular type, 60 cm diameter.

References 

Dams in Kerala
Dams completed in 1991
20th-century architecture in India